The Father is a Bangladeshi film, directed by Kazi Hayat and released in 1979. The film starred Bulbul Ahmed and Shuchorita. The titular role was played by John Napier Adams, a long-term American expatriate and IT consultant for USAID in Bangladesh. This is one of the few instances of a non-Bangladeshi playing a major role in a domestic film. The film gave rise to two hit songs: "Ami Ki Gaibe Gaan" and "Aye Khuku Aye". His depiction of a foreigner father raising an adopted child with Bangladeshi culture and values was critically acclaimed and still remembered. It is stated in the film that the story is based on John Napier Adams's own life. He Lip-synced with the song 'Aai Khuku Aai', which got immense popularity among mass audience and is still considered as an iconic song.

Soundtrack
Hasan Fakhri is the lyricist whereas Azad Rahman is the composer.

"Ami Ki Gaibe Gaan" (female) - Shammi Akhtar
"Ami Ki Gaibe Gaan" (male) - Azad Rahman
"Aye Khuku Aay" - Khurshid Alam
"Oi Modhu Chand" - Runa Laila and Mahmudunnabi

[Note: Runa Laila and Azad Rahman also lent voice to the Soundtrack]

References

1979 films
1979 drama films
Bengali-language Bangladeshi films
Bangladeshi drama films
Films directed by Kazi Hayat
Films scored by Azad Rahman
1970s Bengali-language films